Desert rose may refer to:

Plants

 Adenium, a genus of flowering plants in tropical Africa and Arabia
 Rosa stellata, a flowering plant native to North America
Sturt’s desert rose (Gossypium sturtianum), an Australian shrub related to cotton

Other uses
Desert rose (crystal), a rosette formation of gypsum and barite with sand inclusions
"Desert Rose" (Sting song), a song on Sting's 1999 album Brand New Day
"Desert Rose" (Eric Johnson song), a song on Eric Johnson's 1990 album Ah Via Musicom
 Desert Rose (My Little Pony), a character in the My Little Pony franchise
 Desert Rose Academy Charter School, a public charter high school in Tucson, Arizona
The Desert Rose Band, a country rock band founded by Chris Hillman, Herb Pedersen, and John Jorgenson
 A pattern of Franciscan Ceramics dinnerware
Desert Rose: The Life and Legacy of Coretta Scott King, a biography written by King's sister Edythe Scott Bagley